Mate Skelin (born December 13, 1974) and is a Croatian basketball coach and former player who is an assistant coach for Cedevita Junior of the Croatian League.

Post-playing career  
In 2015, Cedevita head coach Veljko Mrsic named Skelin as the team manager in his staff. In 2017, new Cedevita coach Jure Zdovc confirmed Skelin to team manager until the end of his contract.

In August 2021, Skelin was named an assistant coach for Cedevita Junior.

References

1974 births
Living people
ABA League players
Centers (basketball)
Croatian expatriate basketball people in Bulgaria
Croatian expatriate basketball people in France
Croatian men's basketball players
Élan Béarnais players
Fortitudo Pallacanestro Bologna players
Keravnos B.C. players
KK Cibona players
KK Krka players
Le Mans Sarthe Basket players
PBC CSKA Moscow players
PBC Academic players
Pallacanestro Varese players
Basketball players from Zagreb
KK Dubrava players